Yegor Semyonovich Stroyev (born February 25, 1937)  is a Russian politician and statesman who served as chairman of the Federation Council of Russia between 1996 and 2001. Previously, he was governor of Oryol Oblast from 1993 to 2009. He had a major post in the Communist Party of the Soviet Union. Stroyev was reelected as governor with a very large majority. He was removed from his position on February 16, 2009, by Dmitry Medvedev due to economic concerns.

Honours and awards
 Order of Merit for the Fatherland;
1st class (5 December 2001) - for outstanding contribution to the strengthening and development of Russian statehood and parliamentarianism
2nd class (20 February 1997) - for services to the state, his great personal contribution to the development of Russian parliamentarianism and strengthen friendship and cooperation between nations
3rd class (2 May 1996) - for his great personal contribution to economic reform and development of the state
4th class (25 February 2007) - for services to the state, a large contribution to the socio-economic development of the field and many years of diligent work
 Order of the October Revolution
 Order of the Red Banner of Labour
 Badge of Honor (Order) "Sports Glory of Russia", 1st class (newspaper Komsomolskaya Pravda and the board of the Russian Olympic Committee)
 Diploma of the President of the Russian Federation (12 December 2008) - for active participation in the drafting of the Constitution and a great contribution to the democratic foundations of the Russian Federation
 Order of Friendship (Vietnam)

References

External links

Communist Party of the Soviet Union members
Members of the Federation Council of Russia (1994–1996)
Members of the Federation Council of Russia (1996–2000)
Members of the Federation Council of Russia (after 2000)
1937 births
Full Cavaliers of the Order "For Merit to the Fatherland"
Recipients of the Friendship Order
Living people
Governors of Oryol Oblast
Politburo of the Central Committee of the Communist Party of the Soviet Union members
Chairmen of the Federation Council (Russia)